Alina Voronkova (born 13 December 1994) is a Finnish model and beauty pageant titleholder who was crowned Miss Finland 2018. She represented Finland at the Miss Universe 2018 pageant in Bangkok, Thailand.

Early life 
Voronkova was born in Lahti to a Russian father Dmitry Voronkov, and an Ingrian Finn mother Svetlana Voronkova, who had both moved to Finland from Russia in the early 1990s. She grew up in Pertunmaa, and is bilingual, speaking both Finnish and Russian; the latter she and her family spoke at home. Voronkova attended the University of Helsinki.

Pageantry

Miss Finland 2018 
On 29 September 2018, Voronkova competed in Miss Finland 2018 at the Billnäs Village, where she was crowned as Miss Universe Finland 2018. She succeeded outgoing titleholder Michaela Söderholm.

Miss Universe 2018 
As Miss Finland, Voronkova represented her country at Miss Universe 2018 pageant in Bangkok, Thailand where she did not make the Top 20. Finland failed to place more than 22 years in a row since Miss Universe 1996.

References

External links

1994 births
Finnish beauty pageant winners
Finnish female models
Finnish people of Russian descent
Living people
Miss Finland winners
Miss Universe 2018 contestants
People from Lahti
People of Ingrian Finnish descent
Russian-speaking Finns